Minori may refer to:

Places
 Minori, Campania, Italy
 Minori, Ibaraki, Japan
 Minori Cave, in the Philippines

Other uses
 Minori (given name)
 Minori (company), a Japanese visual novel company
 Minori (train), a former Japanese train service
 Roman Catholic Diocese of Minori, Campania, Italy

See also